Ludovico (or Lodovico) Carracci  (21 April 1555 – 13 November 1619) was an Italian, early-Baroque painter, etcher, and printmaker born in Bologna. His works are characterized by a strong mood invoked by broad gestures and flickering light that create spiritual emotion and are credited with reinvigorating Italian art, especially fresco art, which was subsumed with formalistic Mannerism. He died in Bologna in 1619.

Biography

 
Ludovico apprenticed under Prospero Fontana in Bologna and traveled to Florence, Parma, and Venice, before returning to his hometown.  Together with his cousins Annibale and Agostino Carracci, Ludovico worked in Bologna on the fresco cycles depicting Histories of Jason and Medea (1584) in Palazzo Fava, and the Histories of Romulus and Remus (1590-1592) for the Palazzo Magnani. Their individual contributions to these works are unclear, although Annibale, the younger than Ludovico by 5 years had gained fame as the best of the three. This led to Annibale's famed commission of the Loves of the Gods in the Palazzo Farnese in Rome. Agostino joined Annibale there briefly.

While Ludovico remained in Bologna, this does not mean that he was any less influential, the biography of Lanzi states that around 1585, Ludovico and his cousins had founded the so-called Eclectic Academy of painting (also called the Accademia degli Incamminati). More recent conjectures are that there was no established Academy with curriculum, but that Ludovico tutored many in his studio.

This studio however propelled a number of Emilian artists to pre-eminence in Rome and elsewhere, and singularly helped encourage the so-called Bolognese School of the late 16th century, which included Albani, Guercino, Sacchi, Reni, Lanfranco and Domenichino. The Carracci had their apprentices draw studies focused on observation of nature and natural poses, and use a bold scale in drawing figures. Two of Ludovico's main pupils were Giacomo Cavedone and Francesco Camullo.

Restitution 
In 2009 Carracci's St. Jerome (c. 1595) was restituted to the heirs of Dr. Max Stern, a German Jewish art dealer persecuted and looted by the Nazis

References

Sources
 Babette Bohn, Ludovico Carracci and the Art of Drawing Brepols 2004
 Allessandro Brogi, Ludovico Carracci Bologna 2001
 Andrea Emiliani (ed.),  Ludovico Carracci exh. cat. Bologna-FortWorth 1994 (with Essay and catalogue by Gail Feigenbaum)

External links

Orazio and Artemisia Gentileschi, a fully digitized exhibition catalog from The Metropolitan Museum of Art Libraries, which contains material on Ludovico Carracci (see index)
Whitfield Fine Art 
Catholic Encyclopedia: Carracci

1555 births
1619 deaths
Italian etchers
16th-century Italian painters
Italian male painters
17th-century Italian painters
Painters from Bologna
Italian Baroque painters
Italian Mannerist painters
Catholic painters
Catholic etchers